The M2M Russian Challenge Cup was a golf tournament on the Challenge Tour, played in Russia. It was played from 2010 to 2012 at Tseleevo Golf & Polo Club.

Winners

References

External links

Coverage on the Challenge Tour's official site

Former Challenge Tour events
Golf tournaments in Russia